The square root of 2 (approximately 1.4142) is a positive real number that, when multiplied by itself, equals the number 2. Technically, it should be called the principal square root of 2, to distinguish it from the negative number with the same property.

Geometrically, the square root of 2 is the length of a diagonal across a square with sides of one unit of length; this follows from the Pythagorean theorem. It was probably the first number known to be irrational. The fraction  (≈ 1.4142857) is sometimes used as a good rational approximation with a reasonably small denominator.

Sequence  in the On-Line Encyclopedia of Integer Sequences consists of the digits in the decimal expansion of the square root of 2, here truncated to 65 decimal places:

History

Another early approximation is given in ancient Indian mathematical texts, the Sulbasutras (–200 BC), as follows: Increase the length [of the side] by its third and this third by its own fourth less the thirty-fourth part of that fourth. That is,

Despite having a smaller denominator, it is only slightly less accurate than the Babylonian approximation.

Pythagoreans discovered that the diagonal of a square is incommensurable with its side, or in modern language, that the square root of two is irrational. Little is known with certainty about the time or circumstances of this discovery, but the name of Hippasus of Metapontum is often mentioned. For a while, the Pythagoreans treated as an official secret the discovery that the square root of two is irrational, and, according to legend, Hippasus was murdered for divulging it.

Ancient Roman architecture 
In ancient Roman architecture, Vitruvius describes the use of the square root of 2 progression or ad quadratum technique. It consists basically in a geometric, rather than arithmetic, method to double a square, in which the diagonal of the original square is equal to the side of the resulting square. Vitruvius attributes the idea to Plato. The system was employed to build pavements by creating a square tangent to the corners of the original square at 45 degrees of it. The proportion was also used to design atria by giving them a length equal to a diagonal taken from a square, whose sides are equivalent to the intended atrium's width.

Decimal value

Computation algorithms

There are many algorithms for approximating  as a ratio of integers or as a decimal. The most common algorithm for this, which is used as a basis in many computers and calculators, is the Babylonian method for computing square roots. It goes as follows:

First, pick a guess, ; the value of the guess affects only how many iterations are required to reach an approximation of a certain accuracy. Then, using that guess, iterate through the following recursive computation:

The more iterations through the algorithm (that is, the more computations performed and the greater ""), the better the approximation. Each iteration roughly doubles the number of correct digits.
 1
  = 1.5
  = 1.416...
  = 1.414215...
 = 1.4142135623746...

Rational approximations
A simple rational approximation  (≈ 1.4142857) is sometimes used.

Records in computation
Shigeru Kondo calculated one trillion decimal places in 2010. Such computations aim to check empirically whether such numbers are normal.

Proofs of irrationality
Applying this to the polynomial , it follows that  is either an integer or irrational. Because  is not an integer (2 is not a perfect square),  must therefore be irrational. This proof can be generalized to show that any square root of any natural number that is not a perfect square is irrational.

For other proofs that the square root of any non-square natural number is irrational, see Quadratic irrational number or Infinite descent.

Proof by infinite descent
One proof of the number's irrationality is the following proof by infinite descent. It is also a proof of a negation by refutation: it proves the statement " is not rational" by assuming that it is rational and then deriving a falsehood.

 Assume that  is a rational number, meaning that there exists a pair of integers whose ratio is exactly .
 If the two integers have a common factor, it can be eliminated using the Euclidean algorithm.
( is necessarily even because it is 2 times another whole number.)
 It follows that  must be even (as squares of odd integers are never even).
 Because  is even, there exists an integer  that fulfills .
 Because  is divisible by two and therefore even, and because , it follows that  is also even which means that  is even.
Q.E.D.

Since we have derived a falsehood, the assumption (1) that  is a rational number must be false. This means that  is not a rational number; that is to say,  is irrational.

This proof was hinted at by Aristotle, in his Analytica Priora, §I.23. It appeared first as a full proof in Euclid's Elements, as proposition 117 of Book X. However, since the early 19th century, historians have agreed that this proof is an interpolation and not attributable to Euclid.

Proof by unique factorization
As with the proof by infinite descent, we obtain . Being the same quantity, each side has the same prime factorization by the fundamental theorem of arithmetic, and in particular, would have to have the factor 2 occur the same number of times. However, the factor 2 appears an odd number of times on the right, but an even number of times on the left—a contradiction.

Geometric proof

A simple proof is attributed by John Horton Conway to Stanley Tennenbaum when the latter was a student in the early 1950s and whose most recent appearance is in an article by Noson Yanofsky in the May–June 2016 issue of American Scientist. Given two squares with integer sides respectively a and b, one of which has twice the area of the other, place two copies of the smaller square in the larger as shown in Figure 1. The square overlap region in the middle must equal the sum of the two uncovered squares. However, these squares on the diagonal have positive integer sides that are smaller than the original squares. Repeating this process, there are arbitrarily small squares one twice the area of the other, yet both having positive integer sides, which is impossible since positive integers cannot be less than 1.

Another geometric reductio ad absurdum argument showing that  is irrational appeared in 2000 in the American Mathematical Monthly. It is also an example of proof by infinite descent. It makes use of classic compass and straightedge construction, proving the theorem by a method similar to that employed by ancient Greek geometers. It is essentially the same algebraic proof as in the previous paragraph, viewed geometrically in  another way.

Let  be a right isosceles triangle with hypotenuse length  and legs  as shown in Figure 2. By the Pythagorean theorem, . Let  be a ratio given in its lowest terms.

Join .

Hence  implies . It also follows that .

Hence, there is an even smaller right isosceles triangle, with hypotenuse length  and legs . Therefore,  and  cannot be both integers; hence,  is irrational.

Constructive proof
While the proofs by infinite descent are constructively valid when "irrational" is defined to mean "not rational", we can obtain a constructively stronger statement by using a positive definition of "irrational" as "quantifiably apart from every rational". Let   and  be positive integers such that  (as  satisfies these bounds). Now  and  cannot be equal, since the first has an odd number of factors 2 whereas the second has an even number of factors 2. Thus .

the latter inequality being true because it is assumed that , giving  (otherwise the quantitative apartness can be trivially established).

Proof by Pythagorean triples

This proof uses the following property of primitive Pythagorean triples:

This lemma can be used to show that two identical perfect squares can never be added to produce another perfect square.

Suppose the contrary that  is rational. Therefore,

where  and 
Squaring both sides,

Here,  is a primitive Pythagorean triple, and from the lemma  is never even. However, this contradicts the equation  which implies that  must be even.

Multiplicative inverse
The multiplicative inverse (reciprocal) of the square root of two (i.e., the square root of ) is a widely used constant.

 ...   

This number satisfies

Properties

since

This is related to the property of silver ratios.

 can also be expressed in terms of copies of the imaginary unit  using only the square root and arithmetic operations, if the square root symbol is interpreted suitably for the complex numbers  and :

 is also the only real number other than 1 whose infinite tetrate (i.e., infinite exponential tower) is equal to its square. Or symbolically:

 appears in Viète's formula for :
 
for  square roots and only one minus sign.

Similar in appearance but with a finite number of terms,  appears in various trigonometric constants:

It is not known whether  is a normal number, which is a stronger property than irrationality, but statistical analyses of its binary expansion are consistent with the hypothesis that it is normal to base two.

Representations

Series and product
The identity , along with the infinite product representations for the sine and cosine, leads to products such as

and

or equivalently,

The number can also be expressed by taking the Taylor series of a trigonometric function. For example, the series for  gives

The convergence of this series can be accelerated with an Euler transform, producing

It is not known whether  can be represented with a BBP-type formula.

The number can be represented by an infinite series of Egyptian fractions, with denominators defined by 2n&hairsp;th terms of a Fibonacci-like recurrence relation a(n) = 34a(n−1) − a(n−2), a(0) = 0, a(1) = 6.

Continued fraction

The square root of two has the following continued fraction representation:

The convergents  formed by truncating this representation form a sequence of fractions that approximate the square root of two to increasing accuracy, and that are described by the Pell numbers (i.e.).

Nested square 
The following nested square expressions converge to :

Applications

Paper size

In 1786, German physics professor Georg Christoph Lichtenberg found that any sheet of paper whose long edge is  times longer than its short edge could be folded in half and aligned with its shorter side to produce a sheet with exactly the same proportions as the original. This ratio of lengths of the longer over the shorter side guarantees that cutting a sheet in half along a line results in the smaller sheets having the same (approximate) ratio as the original sheet. When Germany standardised paper sizes at the beginning of the 20th century, they used Lichtenberg's ratio to create the "A" series of paper sizes. Today, the (approximate) aspect ratio of paper sizes under ISO 216 (A4, A0, etc.) is 1:.

Proof:
Let  shorter length and  longer length of the sides of a sheet of paper, with
 as required by ISO 216.
Let  be the analogous ratio of the halved sheet, then
.

Physical sciences
There are some interesting properties involving the square root of 2 in the physical sciences:
 The square root of two is the frequency ratio of a tritone interval in twelve-tone equal temperament music.
 The square root of two forms the relationship of f-stops in photographic lenses, which in turn means that the ratio of areas between two successive apertures is 2.

See also
List of mathematical constants
Square root of 3, 
 Square root of 5, 
Gelfond–Schneider constant, 
 Silver ratio,

Notes

References
 .
 
 Bishop, Errett (1985), Schizophrenia in contemporary mathematics. Errett Bishop: reflections on him and his research (San Diego, Calif., 1983), 1–32, Contemp. Math. 39, Amer. Math. Soc., Providence, RI.
 .
 .
 .
 .

External links
 .
 The Square Root of Two to 5 million digits by Jerry Bonnell and Robert J. Nemiroff. May, 1994.
 Square root of 2 is irrational, a collection of proofs
 

Quadratic irrational numbers
Mathematical constants
Pythagorean theorem
Articles containing proofs